Gernika Club is a Spanish football team based in Gernika, in the autonomous community of Basque Country. Founded in 1922 it plays in Segunda División RFEF – Group 2, holding home games at Estadio Urbieta, with a capacity of 3,000 seats.

Season to season

12 seasons in Segunda División B
2 seasons in Segunda División RFEF
35 seasons in Tercera División

Current squad

Famous players
 Gorka Luariz
  Johann Duveau
  Gorka Iraizoz
  Aritz Lopez Garai
  Koikili Lertxundi

References

External links
Official website 
Futbolme team profile 
Club & stadium history Estadios de España 

Football clubs in the Basque Country (autonomous community)
Association football clubs established in 1922
Guernica
1922 establishments in Spain